Peter J. Wagner (born 27 September 1964) is a paleontologist at the University of Nebraska-Lincoln.  He received his Ph.D. in Geophysical Sciences from The University of Chicago in 1995, conducted postdoctoral research at the Smithsonian Institution, served as a curator at the Field Museum of Natural History from 1996 through 2007, and was at the Smithsonian Institution from 2007 through 2017.  He was given the Charles Schuchert Award of the Paleontological Society in 2004. His research focuses on macroevolution and paleoecology, especially as regards the systematics, evolutionary dynamics, morphology, and distribution of Paleozoic Molluscs. He has published extensively in such journals as Paleobiology, Systematic Biology, and Science and is a contributor to the Paleobiology Database.

Bibliography
 Wagner P. J. 2002. Phylogenetic relationships of the earliest anisostrophically coiled gastropods. Smithsonian Contributions to Paleobiology, 88: 152 pp.

External links
Smithsonian National Museum of Natural History Biography

1964 births
Living people
American paleontologists
University of Michigan alumni
People associated with the Field Museum of Natural History